Len Beynon (24 April 1912 – 17 August 1992) was a professional boxer from Wales. Born in Barry, Vale of Glamorgan, Beynon was notable for becoming Welsh champion at both featherweight and bantamweight.

Bibliography

External links
 

1912 births
1992 deaths
Welsh male boxers
Featherweight boxers
Bantamweight boxers
Sportspeople from Barry, Vale of Glamorgan